The Little Yalmy River is a perennial river of the Snowy River catchment, located in the Alpine region of the Australian state of Victoria.

Course and features
The Little Yalmy River rises below Mount Jersey in the Yalmy State Forest in a remote alpine wilderness area and flows generally south, then southwest, then south by west, before reaching its confluence with the Yalmy River within the Snowy River National Park in the Shire of East Gippsland. The river descends  over its  course.

The traditional custodians of the land surrounding the Little Yalmy River are the Australian Aboriginal Bidawal and Nindi-Ngudjam Ngarigu Monero peoples.

See also

 List of rivers of Australia

References

External links
 
 
 

East Gippsland catchment
Rivers of Gippsland (region)